Estádio Mahafil is a multi-purpose stadium in Maputo, Mozambique.  It is currently used mostly for football matches and is the home stadium of Grupo Desportivo Mahafil. The stadium holds 4,000 people.

References

Costa do Sol
Multi-purpose stadiums in Mozambique
Buildings and structures in Maputo
Sport in Maputo